]l;m;,

Sandplace is a small village in the parish of Morval, two miles north of Looe in Cornwall, Great Britain. It is situated on the B3254, the old Liskeard to Looe road which joins the A387 to the south. The village is alongside the East Looe river and has been served by Sandplace railway station, on the Looe Valley Line since 1881.

History

Sandplace gets its name from a wharf on the river bank where sea-sand was stored, which together with lime (imported from Plymouth and burnt in nearby kilns) was used to improve the acid soils of the area. The fertiliser was transported north out of the village on the Liskeard and Looe Union Canal which was completed in 1828. With the exploitation of copper and tin ores in the Caradon area from 1836 onwards, and the opening of the Liskeard and Caradon Railway in 1844, the canal was not able to cope with the traffic and congestion meant that trade was being lost to competing routes via Calstock and St Germans. A railway line was opened for goods between Moorswater and Looe on 27 December 1860 and the canal went into gradual decline, finally closing in 1910.

Within the village is a coaching inn which was built in around 1740 and is now the Polraen Country House Hotel. It was formerly owned by the Morval Estate which sold it to Peter Bessell the Liberal MP for the Bodmin constituency. Bessell fled abroad in 1970 to avoid debts from a number of unsuccessful companies.

References

Villages in Cornwall
Ports and harbours of Cornwall
Lime kilns in the United Kingdom